Conor J. Daly (born December 15, 1991) is an American professional racing driver who competes in the NTT IndyCar Series, driving the No. 20 Chevrolet for Ed Carpenter Racing, and part-time in the NASCAR Cup Series, driving the No. 50 Chevrolet Camaro ZL1 for The Money Team Racing. He has also raced in the GP2 Series, Road to Indy, NASCAR Truck Series, and the NASCAR Xfinity Series in the past.

Racing career

Karting
At the age of 10, he began competing in karting, and, in 2006, he won the World Karting Association Grand Nationals. He progressed to car racing in 2007 and began racing cars full-time in 2008 in the Skip Barber National Championship, winning first place with 5 wins in 14 races, and Formula Ford.

On October 10, 2010, Daly finished runner-up at the RoboPong 200 all-star kart event at the New Castle Motorsports Park with teammate Graham Rahal. He finished runner-up to a team driven by Jay Howard and Bill McLaughlin Jr. The 2010 Izod IndyCar Series runner-up Will Power and ALMS driver Simon Pagenaud were 4th.

Star Mazda Championship
In 2009, he competed in the Star Mazda Championship for Andersen Racing and finished third in points with a win at New Jersey Motorsports Park. He returned to the series in 2010, driving for Juncos Racing. He became series champion after finishing in the top four positions in each of the twelve races, prior to clinching the title at Mosport International Raceway on August 28, 2010. He also set a series record of 9 poles and 7 wins en route to his championship.

Indy Lights
In 2011, Daly competed part-time in the Indy Lights series with Sam Schmidt Motorsports. His best result of the season was a win at the Grand Prix of Long Beach.

In 2013, Daly returned to Indy Lights with a one-off appearance in the Houston race for Team Moore Racing, finishing third.

GP3 Series

Alongside his commitments in the Indy Lights series, Daly competed in GP3 in 2011 with Carlin Motorsport.

For 2012, Daly continued in GP3 driving, for the Lotus GP team. He took his maiden GP3 win in the second race of the season at Barcelona. In the second race at Monaco, he made contact with the damaged car of Dmitry Suranovich which launched Daly into a catch fence and forced the race to be red flagged.

For 2013 Daly remained in GP3, racing with the ART Grand Prix team. Daly captured one win at the Valencia Street Circuit feature race and placed third in the championship.

GP2 Series
Daly competed in the 2013 GP2 Series season season-opener at Sepang International Circuit with Hilmer Motorsport. He finished seventh in the sprint race and scored two championship points.

For 2014, Daly competed with Venezuela GP Lazarus for 18 of the 22 rounds, with a best finish of seventh place in the sprint race at the Hungaroring.

IndyCar
Daly drove in the 2013 Indianapolis 500 for A. J. Foyt Enterprises. He finished the race in 22nd position.

In 2015, Daly subbed in for Rocky Moran Jr. at the Long Beach GP with Dale Coyne Racing. He then returned for the 2015 Indianapolis 500 in the Smithfield Foods "Fueled by Bacon" special run by Schmidt Peterson Motorsports, but was forced to retire before the green flag due to a mechanical failure. He replaced James Hinchcliffe for 3 rounds following Hinchcliffe's injury from a practice crash leading up to the Indy 500. He finished sixth at the second race at Detroit.

In 2016, Daly raced the full 2016 IndyCar season for Dale Coyne Racing. He led 56 laps at 5 different races, and finished 2nd in the first race at Detroit for his first career IndyCar podium. For the 2017 season, Daly raced the number 4 car for A. J. Foyt Enterprises.

Daly lost his ride with Foyt for 2018, but was signed by Coyne for the 2018 Indianapolis 500. His No. 17 car, fielded in conjunction with Thom Burns Racing, was sponsored by the United States Air Force.

In 2019, Andretti Autosport signed Daly to enter the Indianapolis 500, where he finished tenth. On June 4, 2019, he replaced Max Chilton at Carlin for the Texas Motor Speedway race, finishing 11th. Daly would replace Chilton at the remaining oval races for the season, with a best result of 6th place at Gateway. On August 29, 2019, Daly was announced as a replacement for Marcus Ericsson for the round at Portland as Ericsson had been called up by Alfa Romeo to be on reserve driver duty at the F1 race at Spa. Daly would also return to Andretti Autosport for the season finale.

On December 9, 2019 it was revealed that, for the 2020 IndyCar Series season, Daly was signed to contest the 12 road and street circuit races in the No. 20 Ed Carpenter Racing entry. Daly was also contracted to compete in the 2020 Indianapolis 500 in an additional Ed Carpenter Racing entry. On March 10, 2020, Carlin announced they have signed Daly to compete in the remaining oval races in the No. 59 entry, thus giving Daly full-time status for the 2020 season.

Daly finished 6th at the 2020 season opener at Texas Motor Speedway. He claimed his first IndyCar Series pole position at the first race of a doubleheader at Iowa Speedway, which was the first pole for Carlin as an IndyCar team.

Daly and teammate Rinus VeeKay dominated the first half of the 2021 Indianapolis 500, leading 72 of the first 102 laps. However, damage to Daly's nose cone from an accident involving Graham Rahal on lap 119 prevented him from seriously challenging for the lead again, and he finished 13th. Daly led the most laps of any driver during the race, with 40.

In 2022, Daly would run full-time in the No. 20 for Ed Carpenter Racing. His best result that year was a fifth place at the IMS Grand Prix on May 14, after the Indy lights race session was postponed by lightning. He would go on to finish 17th in points.

Formula One
In May 2012, Daly performed a straight line aero test for Force India at Cotswold Airport in Gloucestershire, England.

MRF Challenge
Daly won the 2012–13 MRF Challenge Formula 2000 Championship in India, claiming four wins and two further podiums.

NASCAR

On May 11, 2018, Daly announced he would be making his NASCAR Xfinity Series debut at Road America in August, driving the No. 6 Ford Mustang for Roush Fenway Racing with sponsorship from Eli Lilly and Company. Both Daly and his teammate, full-time Roush Xfinity driver Ryan Reed, are Type 1 diabetics, and that was how the deal was put together. Before the race, it was announced that Lilly would not be sponsoring Daly in the race when it was discovered that his father Derek had used a racial slur during an interview in the 1980s.

In 2020, Daly joined Niece Motorsports to make his second NASCAR start, and his first in the NASCAR Truck Series, where he competed in the race at Las Vegas Motor Speedway in the team's No. 42 truck. Daly had a $1 bet with Niece teammate and iRacing rival Travis Pastrana on the outcome of the race, which Daly won by virtue of his 18th-place finish. Daly returned to Niece Motorsports to drive at Las Vegas for them again in 2021, although this time in the track's February race and in the No. 44.

In September 2022, Daly announced on Twitter that he would make his Cup Series debut for The Money Team Racing in the fall Charlotte race. On December 5, 2022, TMT co-owner Willy Auchmoody revealed in an interview with TobyChristie.com that Daly would return to the team to drive their No. 50 car part-time in the Cup Series in 2023. Daly made the 2023 Daytona 500 starting lineup after finishing 17th in Duel 2 of the 2023 Bluegreen Vacations Duels, despite experiencing handling problems during the qualifying race. Daly became the 62nd driver to compete in both the Indy500 and the Daytona 500.
 He eventually finished 29th out of the 40 car field. At the time of the race finish, Daly’s no. 50 car completed 206 laps of the total 212 laps of the race.

Personal life
Daly is the son of former Formula One, CART, and IMSA driver Derek Daly, and the stepson of Indianapolis Motor Speedway president Doug Boles.

Daly was diagnosed with Type 1 diabetes at age 14 and was sponsored by Lilly Diabetes in the 2016 and 2018 Indianapolis 500s and was going to again in his Xfinity start at Road America before the controversy involving his father Derek.

Daly appeared on the 30th season of The Amazing Race, teaming with fellow IndyCar driver Alexander Rossi where they finished in 4th place.

Daly's first cousin, Nicola Daly, is an Ireland women's field hockey international and was a member of the squad that won the silver medal at the 2018 Women's Hockey World Cup. She also works as a data engineer for Juncos Racing.

Racing record

Career summary

* Season still in progress.

American open-wheel racing results
(key)

Star Mazda Championship
{| class="wikitable" style="text-align:center; font-size:90%"
! Year
! Team
! 1
! 2
! 3
! 4
! 5
! 6
! 7
! 8
! 9
! 10
! 11
! 12
! 13
! Rank
! Points
|-
| 2009
! Andersen Racing
|style="background:#FFDF9F;"| SEB
|style="background:#DFFFDF;"| VIR
|style="background:#CFCFFF;"| MMP
|style="background:#FFFFBF;"|NJ1
|style="background:#DFFFDF;"| NJ2
|style="background:#EFCFFF;"| WIS
|style="background:#DFDFDF;"| IOW
|style="background:#FFDF9F;"| ILL
|style="background:#DFFFDF;"| ILL|style="background:#CFCFFF;"| QUE
|style="background:#DFDFDF;"| ONT
|style="background:#DFDFDF;"| ATL
|style="background:#DFFFDF;"| LAG
!style="background:#FFDF9F;"| 3rd
!style="background:#FFDF9F;"| 416
|-
| 2010
! Juncos Racing
|style="background:#FFDF9F;"| SEB
|style="background:#FFFFBF;"| STP|style="background:#FFFFBF;"| LAG
|style="background:#FFFFBF;"| ORP|style="background:#FFFFBF;"| IOW|style="background:#FFDF9F;"| NJ1|style="background:#DFFFDF;"| NJ2
|style="background:#FFDF9F;"| ACC|style="background:#FFFFBF;"| ACC|style="background:#FFDF9F;"| TRO
|style="background:#FFFFBF;"| ROA|style="background:#FFFFBF;"| MOS
|style="background:#FFDF9F;"| ATL
!style="background:#FFFFBF;"| 1st
!style="background:#FFFFBF;"| 539
|}

Indy Lights

IndyCar Series
(key)

* Season still in progress.

Indianapolis 500

Daly did not start the 2015 Indianapolis 500 due to losing an engine during the pace laps.

Complete GP3 Series results
(key) (Races in bold indicate pole position) (Races in italics indicate fastest lap)

Complete GP2 Series results
(key) (Races in bold indicate pole position) (Races in italics'' indicate fastest lap)

Complete IMSA SportsCar Championship results
(key)(Races in bold indicate pole position, Results are overall/class)

NASCAR
(key) (Bold – Pole position awarded by qualifying time. Italics – Pole position earned by points standings or practice time. * – Most laps led.)

Cup Series

Daytona 500

Xfinity Series

Camping World Truck Series

 Season still in progress

References

External links

 
 
 
 

1991 births
Living people
People from Noblesville, Indiana
Racing drivers from Indiana
Racing drivers from Indianapolis
World Karting Association drivers
Indy Pro 2000 Championship drivers
Indy Lights drivers
American GP3 Series drivers
IndyCar Series drivers
Indianapolis 500 drivers
GP2 Series drivers
24 Hours of Daytona drivers
WeatherTech SportsCar Championship drivers
NASCAR drivers
MRF Challenge Formula 2000 Championship drivers
People with type 1 diabetes
The Amazing Race (American TV series) contestants
American Ninja Warrior contestants
Conor
Carlin racing drivers
Arrow McLaren SP drivers
ART Grand Prix drivers
Hilmer Motorsport drivers
A. J. Foyt Enterprises drivers
Team Moore Racing drivers
Team Lazarus drivers
Dale Coyne Racing drivers
Starworks Motorsport drivers
Harding Steinbrenner Racing drivers
Andretti Autosport drivers
Ed Carpenter Racing drivers
Juncos Hollinger Racing drivers
Double R Racing drivers
RFK Racing drivers